Ed Cooper is currently a Republican member of the Wyoming Senate representing District 20 since January 4, 2021.

Career
Cooper is a self-employed oil and gas consultant. On November 3, 2020, Kolb defeated Democrat Theresa Livingston for the Wyoming Senate seat representing the 20th district. Cooper was sworn in as State Senator on January 4, 2021.

References

Businesspeople from Wyoming
People from Washakie County, Wyoming
Republican Party Wyoming state senators
21st-century American politicians
Year of birth missing (living people)
Living people